Kathy Stinson (born 1952) is a Canadian children's writer.

Life 
Stinson was born in Toronto, taught elementary school there and studied at the University of Toronto.

She lives in Rockwood, Ontario with her partner Peter Carver, a retired editor.

Reception

A Season of Sorrow was said to be "delightfully written with very down-to-earth and realistically portrayed characters" by Tracy's Book Nook. In 2015, Today's Parent magazine named Red is Best one of the 8 best Canadian books for babies and toddlers.

Bibliography

Red is Best (1982, Anniversary Edition, 2006)
Big or Little (1983, Anniversary Edition 2009)
Mom and Dad Don't Live Together Anymore (1984, Revised Edition 2007)
Those Green Things (1985, Revised Edition 1995)
The Bare Naked Book (1986, Anniversary Edition 2006, Revised Edition 2021)
Seven Clues in Pebble Creek (1987, Revised Edition 2005)
Teddy Rabbit (1988)
The Dressed Up Book (1990)
Who is Sleeping in Aunty's Bed? (1991)
Steven's Baseball Mitt (1992, Revised Edition 1998)
Fish House Secrets (1992)
The Fabulous Ball Book (1993)
Writing Your Best Picture Book Ever (1994)
The Great Pebble Creek Bike Race (1994, Revised Edition 2005)
One Year Commencing (1997)
King of the Castle (2000)
Marie-Claire: Dark Spring (2001)
Marie-Claire: A Season of Sorrow (2002)
Becoming Ruby (2003)
Marie-Claire: Visitors (2003)
Marie-Claire: Angels in Winter (2004)
One More Clue (2005)
101 Ways to Dance (2006)
A Pocket Can Have A Treasure In It (2008)
Love Every Leaf: the life of landscape architect Cornelia Hahn Oberlander (2008)
Big or Little? 25th anniversary edition (2009)
Highway of Heroes (2010)
The Man with the Violin (2013), received the TD Canadian Children's Literature Award and was shortlisted for the Ruth and Sylvia Schwartz Children's Book Award
Harry and Walter (2016)
The Dance of the Violin (2017)
The Dog Who Wanted to Fly (2019)
The Lady with the Books: A Story Inspired by the Remarkable Work of Jella Lepman (2020)
The Girl Who Loved Giraffes and Became the World's First Giraffologist (2021)

References

External links 

 
 Kathy Stinson bio on Annick Press website
 Kathy Stinson at the Canadian Society of Children's Authors, Illustrators, and Performers (CANSCAIP.org)
 

Living people
Canadian children's writers
Place of birth missing (living people)
1952 births